Persatuan Sepakbola Indonesia Pasee (simply known as Persip Pasee) is an Indonesian football club based in North Aceh Regency, Aceh. They currently compete in the Liga 3.

References

External links
 Persip Pasee Instagram

Football clubs in Indonesia
Football clubs in Aceh
Association football clubs established in 1998
1998 establishments in Indonesia